Patricio Etcheverry (born 6 March 1943) is a Chilean athlete. He competed in the men's javelin throw at the 1964 Summer Olympics.

References

1943 births
Living people
Athletes (track and field) at the 1964 Summer Olympics
Athletes (track and field) at the 1967 Pan American Games
Athletes (track and field) at the 1971 Pan American Games
Chilean male javelin throwers
Olympic athletes of Chile
Sportspeople from Santiago
Pan American Games competitors for Chile
20th-century Chilean people